Fountain-Fort Carson School District 8, shortened as FFC8 or D8, is a public school district serving the southwestern area of El Paso County, Colorado, United States. Its schools are mostly based in Fountain, but it also has schools on the nearby Fort Carson military installation.

List of schools
Fountain-Fort Carson School District 8 has thirteen schools, including five on Fort Carson.

References

External links

School districts in Colorado